Thomas de Beauchamp, 12th Earl of Warwick, KG (16 March 13388 April 1401) was an English medieval nobleman and one of the primary opponents of Richard II.

Origins

He was the son of Thomas de Beauchamp, 11th Earl of Warwick by his wife Katherine Mortimer, a daughter of Roger Mortimer, 1st Earl of March (d.1369).

Career 

Knighted around 1355, Beauchamp accompanied John of Gaunt in campaigns in France in 1373, and around that time was made a Knight of the Garter. In the parliaments of 1376 and 1377 he was one of those appointed to supervise reform of King Richard II's government. When these were not as effective as hoped, Beauchamp was made Governor over the King. In 1377, or 1378, he granted the manors of Croome Adam (now Earls Croome) in Worcestershire and Grafton Flyford in Warwickshire to Henry de Ardern for a red rose. Between 1377 and 1378 he was appointed Admiral of the North. Beauchamp brought a large contingent of soldiers and archers to King Richard's Scottish campaign of 1385.

Conflict with King Richard II 
In 1387 he was one of the Lords Appellant, who endeavored to separate Richard II from his favorites. After Richard regained power, Beauchamp retired to his estates, but was invited to London on a ruse in 1397 and charged with high treason, supposedly as a part of the Earl of Arundel's alleged conspiracy. He was imprisoned in the Tower of London (in what is now known as the "Beauchamp Tower"), pleaded guilty and threw himself on the mercy of the king. He forfeited his estates and titles, and was sentenced to life imprisonment on the Isle of Man. The next year, however, he was moved back to the Tower, until he was released in August 1399 after Henry Bolingbroke's capture of Richard II.

Restored by King Henry IV 
After Bolingbroke deposed Richard and became king as Henry IV, Beauchamp was restored to his titles and estates. He was one of those who urged the new King to murder Richard, and accompanied King Henry against the rebellion of 1400.

Marriage and children

He married Margaret Ferrers, daughter of William Ferrers, 3rd Baron Ferrers of Groby by his wife Margaret d'Ufford, a daughter of Robert d'Ufford, 1st Earl of Suffolk. by his wife he had children including:
Richard de Beauchamp, 13th Earl of Warwick (1382–1439), son and heir.
Agnes de Beauchamp, married Thomas Borges of Wraxall & Braunton (d. 1401).

Death and succession 
Beauchamp died in 1401 (sources differ as to whether on 8 April or 8 August). and was succeeded by his son Richard de Beauchamp, 13th Earl of Warwick. He was buried with his wife Margaret in the south transept of the Collegiate Church of St Mary, Warwick, but their tomb was destroyed by fire in 1694. Only the monumental brass survived, which is still on display at St Mary's.

Ancestry

References

Sources

External links
 thePeerage.com on the "junior" Thomas de Beauchamp, Earl of Warwick

1338 births
1401 deaths
14th-century English nobility
15th-century English nobility
Thomas
Burials at the Collegiate Church of St Mary (Warwick)
Earls of Warwick (1088 creation)
English admirals
English people of French descent
High Sheriffs of Worcestershire
Garter Knights appointed by Edward III